Gordon "Felix" Mills (born July 28, 1901 in Fort Collins, Colorado), was a composer, arranger and conductor during the Golden Age of Radio in the 1930s and 1940s. He was the musical director for The Mickey Mouse Theater of the Air, a Disney radio show of the 1930s. Mills created a "gadget band" with wild instruments for Donald Duck to direct on some episodes.  He also created arrangements for the show.

Mills conducted his own band, and appeared in the Hollywood Bowl. Mills was also the musical director for CBS Radio's Silver Theater from 1937 to 1947. Mills chose to retire rather than fire some band members during the Red Inquisition; he built a home in Morro Bay, California to pursue his favorite hobbies, sailing and slide photography. Mills died on April 5, 1987 in Morro Bay, California.

References 

American male composers
American male conductors (music)
American music arrangers
American radio personalities
1901 births
1987 deaths
20th-century American conductors (music)
20th-century American composers
People from Fort Collins, Colorado
People from Morro Bay, California
20th-century American male musicians